The following lists events that happened during 2002 in the Democratic Republic of São Tomé and Príncipe.

Incumbents
President: Miguel Trovoada
Prime Minister: Fradique de Menezes (from 3 September)

Events
2 March: The legislative election took place
27 March: President Fradique de Menezes ended three weeks of political deadlock by asking the country's envoy to Portugal, Gabriel Costa, to form a government. The latter formed a government with representatives from the three main political coalitions.
May: the National Library of São Tomé and Príncipe opened
18 April: Dionísio Tomé Dias becomes president of the National Assembly

References

 
Years of the 21st century in São Tomé and Príncipe
2000s in São Tomé and Príncipe
São Tomé and Príncipe
São Tomé and Príncipe